A Tribute to Joni Mitchell is a musical tribute to Joni Mitchell featuring Sufjan Stevens, Björk, Caetano Veloso, Brad Mehldau, Cassandra Wilson, Prince, Sarah McLachlan, Annie Lennox, Emmylou Harris, Elvis Costello, k.d. lang, and James Taylor.

Track listing

Charts

References

2007 compilation albums
Joni Mitchell tribute albums
Nonesuch Records compilation albums